Strmec is a village located west of Zagreb, Croatia, near Sveta Nedelja, Zagreb County. The population is 3,907 (census 2011).
Between 1910 and 1991, it was known as Strmec Samoborski.

References

Populated places in Zagreb County